The Great Fountain Geyser is a fountain-type geyser located in the Firehole Lake area of Lower Geyser Basin of Yellowstone National Park, Wyoming.  It is the only Lower Geyser Basin feature that the park makes predictions for.

Eruption
The geyser erupts every 9 to 15 hours. Its duration is usually about one hour but durations of over two hours have been seen. The duration of an eruption affects the interval that will elapse before the next eruption, so that if the duration of an eruption is recorded, the time of the following eruption can be predicted to a precision of about two hours. The prediction can be refined, to plus or minus 15 minutes or so, through observation of overflow from the crater during the period between eruptions. While this pattern of behavior is observed most of the time, there are occasional episodes of so-called "wild-phase" activity during which the eruptions are of greatly extended duration and intervals between eruptions may be as long as three days. The geyser is then unpredictable until wild-phase activity ceases and more normal eruptions resume.

Nearby White Dome Geyser, which erupts considerably more frequently (albeit less powerfully) from a large geyserite cone, is easily seen from the same parking lot that affords a viewpoint for Great Fountain. The thermophilic bacterium Thermus aquaticus, important because it produces an enzyme used in polymerase chain reaction laboratory procedures central to modern molecular biology, was first isolated from Mushroom Pool, a non-eruptive hot spring a few hundred feet from White Dome Geyser.

References

External links

 

Geothermal features of Yellowstone National Park
Geothermal features of Teton County, Wyoming
Geysers of Teton County, Wyoming
Geysers of Wyoming